Alina Karmazina (born on 19 July 1981 in Tallinn) is an Estonian actress.

From 2004 to 2009 she worked at the Vanemuine Theatre in Tartu, and since 2013 she is working at the Russian Theatre in Tallinn. She has also played in television series and films.

Selected roles in television series and films
 2004-2011: Kodu keset linna (television series)
 2011: Letters to Angel (feature film)
 2011: Rotilõks (feature film)
 2012: Europa Blues (feature film)
 2015: The Fencer (feature film; role: coach from Armenia)

References

Living people
1981 births
Estonian stage actresses
Estonian film actresses
Estonian television actresses
21st-century Estonian actresses
Estonian Academy of Music and Theatre alumni
Estonian people of Russian descent
Actresses from Tallinn